Bhunya Airfield  is a rural airstrip serving Bhunya, a forest products community in the Manzini Region of Eswatini.

The Google Earth Historical Imagery (6/2/2018) image shows the runway and airstrip boundary have been planted with trees.

See also
Transport in Eswatini
List of airports in Eswatini

References

External links
OpenStreetMap - Bhunya Airfield
 Google Earth (6/2/2018)
Bloomberg - Usutu Forest Products Co

Airports in Eswatini